Madawa Macrada is a Chadian football player and the member of Chad national football team. He has 2 caps for national team earned in qualifying matches for 2012 Africa Cup of Nations. He plays club football in Gazelle FC in Chad.

See also
 List of Chad international footballers

References

External links

Year of birth missing (living people)
Living people
Chadian footballers
Chad international footballers
Place of birth missing (living people)
Association football midfielders